Roger Brian Blackmore (born 1941) is a Liberal Democrat politician.  He was  leader of Leicester City Council from 2003 to 2004 and 2005 to 2007 and Lord Mayor of Leicester  2009/10.

Education
He was educated at Abingdon School from September 1954 until December 1956 and then studied Social Sciences at the University of Leicester.

Career
He stayed in the city after graduating in 1963 to work at Imperial Typewriters.  He became a lecturer at Charles Keene College in 1968.

He was elected to Leicestershire County Council for the Western Park division in 1993, and then to Leicester City Council for the same ward in 1995. In 2000 he became leader of the Liberal Democrat group on the council. After the 2003 local elections, the Liberal Democrats became the largest party on the council, and Blackmore became leader in May 2003, leading a Liberal Democrat/Conservative coalition. From November 2004 to May 2005 Ross Willmott served as leader, in a minority Labour administration. He stood down from the council in 2011.

Blackmore was a Parliamentary candidate on six occasions during the 1970s and 1980s, fighting Gainsborough and North Devon.

See also
 List of Old Abingdonians

References

External links
Biography at the Leicester City Council website

1941 births
People educated at Abingdon School
Liberal Democrats (UK) councillors
Alumni of the University of Leicester
Living people
Councillors in Leicestershire
Mayors of places in Leicestershire
Leaders of local authorities of England